In chaos theory, the correlation sum is the estimator of the correlation integral, which reflects the mean probability that the states at two different times are close:

where  is the number of considered states ,  is a threshold distance,  a norm (e.g. Euclidean norm) and  the Heaviside step function. If only a time series is available, the phase space can be reconstructed by using a time delay embedding (see Takens' theorem):

where  is the time series,  the embedding dimension and  the time delay.

The correlation sum is used to estimate the correlation dimension.

See also
Recurrence quantification analysis

References
 

Chaos theory
Dynamical systems
Dimension theory